The Bagatelle Plantation is a Southern plantation with a historic mansion in Sunshine, Louisiana, USA.

The house was designed by architect Robert S. Chadsey in the Greek Revival architectural style in 1841 for the plantation owner, Augustin Marius Tureaud.

The historic house has been moved twice. After the Great Mississippi Flood of 1927 it was moved a further back from the levee, inside the same property in St. James Parish. In 1977 a second move, due to a purchase of the land by Missouri-Portland Cement Company, brought the house to its present location in Iberville Parish.

The house was listed on the National Register of Historic Places on May 9, 2007.

See also
National Register of Historic Places listings in Iberville Parish, Louisiana

References

Plantation houses in Louisiana
Greek Revival houses in Louisiana
Houses in Iberville Parish, Louisiana
Houses on the National Register of Historic Places in Louisiana
National Register of Historic Places in Iberville Parish, Louisiana